USS LST-961 was an  in the United States Navy. Like many of her class, she was not named and is properly referred to by her hull designation.

Construction
LST-961 was laid down on 13 October 1944, at Hingham, Massachusetts, by the Bethlehem-Hingham Shipyard; launched on 11 November 1944; and commissioned on 6 December 1944.

Service history
During World War II, LST-961 was assigned to the Asiatic-Pacific theater and participated in the Palawan Island landings in March 1945, and the assault and occupation of Okinawa Gunto in May and June 1945.

Following the war, she performed occupation duty in the Far East and saw service in China until mid-April 1946. She returned to the United States and was decommissioned on 23 July 1946, and struck from the Navy list on 28 August, that same year. On 10 December 1947, the ship was sold to The Learner Co., Oakland, California, for scrapping.

Awards
LST-961 earned two battle stars for World War II service.

Notes

Citations

Bibliography 

Online resources

External links
 

 

LST-542-class tank landing ships
World War II amphibious warfare vessels of the United States
Ships built in Hingham, Massachusetts
1944 ships